Galena City School District is a school district in Galena, Alaska.

It operates:
 Sidney C. Huntington School (K-8 school)
 Galena Interior Learning Academy (GILA) (9-12, includes a boarding school)

References

External links
 

School districts in Alaska
Buildings and structures in Yukon–Koyukuk Census Area, Alaska
Public boarding schools in the United States
Public high schools in Alaska